Brookville is a rural community in Cumberland County, Nova Scotia.

References

Communities in Cumberland County, Nova Scotia